Budaya is the plural form of the word Budi. Budi is synonymous to akal budi or kebudayaan. This original Indonesian word is very philosophical, since it has been explained, interpreted, re-interpreted, and made a philosophical discourse in Indonesian philosophers' circle up to this time. Indonesian philosophy world is not considered as complete without mentioning this discourse. Its derivatives, such as Budayawan, Budiman, and Budi daya, are now also discussed among Indonesian philosophers, especially those who are called philosophers of Kebudayaan.

Philosophers of the various schools of philosophy define the word Budi (plural, Budaya) with different definitions, suited to their school interests. The oldest definition of the word is found in the 18th century Ancient Javanese manuscript Serat Centhini. According to the text, Budi is suprahuman, spiritual entity which mediates between God's being and human's being. It is a purely spiritual substance originated from God. Here is the excerpt:

English translation:

It is the Budi with this meaning that is used by Dr. Wahidin Soedirohusodo to name his and his fellows' first native political society Budi Utomo in the Dutch East Indies of the early 19th century.

The Budi in this meaning is also similar to the Sufi concept of Nur Muhammad or the Platonic concept of The Universal Soul or the Islamic philosophical concept of Al-'Aql Al-Awwal.

Modern definition (19th century onwards)
Modern European learning introduced by the Portuguese-Spanish Catholics and the Dutch Protestants to Indonesian native educational institutions in the 20th century influenced the definition of the word Budi. In this intellectual period, Budi is re-defined and re-interpreted not as spiritual as understood before, but as human entity. In 1961, for example, Nicolas Drijarkara defined Budi as ethical reason or moral reason as understood by the moralist Immanuel Kant. Poedjawijatna, another philosopher, defined Budi as Indonesian translation of the English word reason or reasoning and Filsafat Budi as of the English word Logics. Ki Hajar Dewantara, a preeminent Javanese thinker, in the early 1970s defined Budi  as the matured human soul.  Sutan Takdir Alisjahbana, a great Indonesian thinker of the century, defined Budi as psychological pattern contained in it basic life needs, instincts, feelings, thought, passions and fantasies. Here is the excerpt:

Budi as culture
The philosopher in Indonesian history of philosophy who firstly understood Budi (or more frequently, Kebudayaan) as culture is Sutan Takdir Alisjahbana (1908–1994). Koentjaraningrat, an American-trained anthropologist, then continued using the meaning in his famous book, Manusia dan Kebudayaan di Indonesia. Sidi Gazalba, another philosopher of Kebudayaan, defined Budi or Kebudayaan as a way of life owned and held by any cultural unity. Today's Indonesian thinkers, like Sutan Syahrir, Soedjatmoko, Dick Hartoko, Abdurrahman Wahid, Mochtar Kusumaatmaja, Mochtar Lubis, Sayidiman Suryohadiprojo, Y.B. Mangunwijaya, Nurcholish Madjid, Darmanto Jatman, and other modernists, hold this cultural-anthropological meaning of Budi. It can even be said that this meaning has been dominating the philosophical discourse of today. All philosophers holding this meaning has been acknowledged nationally as Philosophers of Kebudayaan.

References

Philosophy
Indonesian philosophy